Association Sportive Otohô is a Congolese football club based in Oyo.

Honours
Congo Premier League: 5
Winner: 2018, 2018-19, 2019-20, 2021, 2021-22 
Runners-up: 2017

Coupe du Congo
Runners-up: 2018

Performance in CAF competitions
CAF Champions League: 5 appearances
2018 – Preliminary Round
2019 – First Round
2020 – Preliminary Round
2021 – Preliminary Round
2022 – Second Round

CAF Confederation Cup: 2 appearances
2018-19 – Group Stage 
2021-22 - Group Stage

References

External links
Facebook page

Football clubs in the Republic of the Congo